Underwood is a rural locality and town in the local government area of Launceston, in the Northern region of Tasmania. The 2016 census determined a population of 363 for the state suburb of Underwood.

History
The area was first settled in 1854, and by the 1860s a village named Underwood existed. The locality was gazetted in 1963.

Geography
Pipers River rises in the north-east and flows through to the north-west.

Road infrastructure
The B81 route (Lilydale Road) enters from the south-west and runs through to the north before exiting. Route B83 (Pipers River Road) starts at an intersection with B81 in the south-west corner and exits to the north. Route C823 (Underwood Road / Brown Mountain Road) starts at an intersection with B81 and runs north-west through the village of Underwood before exiting. Route C824 (Prossers Road) starts at an intersection with B81 and exits to the south-east.

References

Launceston, Tasmania
Localities of City of Launceston
Towns in Tasmania